Frans Freno Sauyai (born June 6, 1987) is an Indonesian footballer who currently plays for Persiram Raja Ampat in the Indonesia Super League.

Club statistics

References

External links

1987 births
Association football midfielders
Living people
Indonesian footballers
Papuan sportspeople
Liga 1 (Indonesia) players
Persiram Raja Ampat players
Indonesian Premier Division players